Dalhousie Junction is a local service district in Restigouche County, New Brunswick, Canada. As of 2016, its population is 396 people.

History

Notable people

See also
List of communities in New Brunswick

References
 

Communities in Restigouche County, New Brunswick
Designated places in New Brunswick
Local service districts of Restigouche County, New Brunswick
Rail junctions in Canada